Starting in the 2016–17 season, the all new Formula 4 UAE Championship was launched by the Federation Internationale de l'Automobile, and its national affiliate the Automobile & Touring Club of the United Arab Emirates (ATCUAE), who acted as the championship's promoter. Currently, the series is governed by the Emirates Motorsport Organisation (EMSO) and promoted by AUH Motorsports.

History

In 2013, the FIA Single seat commission announced their intention to introduce a new category of single seat racing in order to bridge the gap between karting and Formula 3.

Throughout the following two years, the ATCUAE has worked to develop a Formula 4 championship for the UAE, which will be the first in the Middle East and North African region. One of the first steps taken was to appoint Dubai based AUH Motorsports to manage the championship, based on their experience and expertise in having run the regional Radical Sportscars series for several years.

In February 2016, the championship was launched in spectacular fashion in front of the world's tallest building, the Burj Khalifa in Dubai, with the public unveiling of the car undertaken by HH Nahyan bin Mubarak Al Nahyan, the Minister of Culture and Knowledge Development and Chairman of the General Authority for Youth and Sports Welfare, and Mohammed Ben Sulayem, President of the ATCUAE.

Following the launch in February 2016, the car was given its first test around the Dubai Autodrome, driven by Dubai-born Indy Lights driver Ed Jones.

Format

The inaugural 2016–17 championship featured eighteen races over six weekends, four of which were held at the Yas Marina Circuit in Abu Dhabi, with the remaining two at the Dubai Autodrome. As of 2021, the championship features twenty races over five rounds. The race weekends consist of two qualifying sessions determining grids for Race 1 and 3. Starting grids of Race 2 are set by the second fastest lap during Qualifying 1 and grids of Race 4 are with the top eight drivers having their positions reversed from Race 3 results.

Car
The championship features Tatuus designed and built cars. The cars are constructed out of carbon fibre and feature a monocoque chassis.

From 2016–17 season to 2021 the series used F4-T014 model and 1.4 turbo Abarth engine. The same combination of the chassis and the engine was used in the Italian F4 Championship, F4 Spanish Championship, ADAC Formula 4 and SMP F4 Championship.

In the 2022 season, the series is set to be the host for the global debut of the new second-generation Tatuus F4 race car. The car called F4-T-421 will be a complete rework of Formula 4 car according to the 2nd Generation technical regulations, with the most significant being the introduction of the halo system.

Champions

Drivers

Teams

Rookie

Circuits 

 Bold denotes a circuit used in the 2022 season.
 Italic denotes a future circuit will be used in the 2023 season.

Notes

References

External links
 Official website
 ATCUAE website
 AUH Motorsport Website
 Emirates Motorsports Organization website

 
Formula racing series
Motorsport in the United Arab Emirates
One-make series
Motorsport competitions in the United Arab Emirates